Luciano Suriani (born 11 January 1957) is an Italian prelate of the Catholic Church who has serves as Apostolic Nuncio to Bulgaria from 2022.

Biography
Suriani was born in 1957 in Atessa, Chieti. He was ordained a priest on 5 August 1981. He was incardinated in the diocese of Chieti-Vasto. He earned a doctorate in canon law from the Pontifical Ecclesiastical Academy.

He entered the diplomatic service of the Holy See on 1 June 1990, and worked in the papal diplomatic missions to Ivory Coast, Switzerland, the Section for Relations with States at the Secretariat of State, and the Nunciature to Italy, by which time he held the rank of counselor.

Apart from Italian, he knows Spanish, French and English.

On 22 February 2008 by Pope Benedict XVI appointed him Apostolic Nuncio to Bolivia and titular archbishop of Amiternum, On 26 April 2008 he was ordained a bishop by Tarcisio Cardinal Bertone.
 
He was replaced as Nuncio to Bolivia after nine months on 22 September by Giambattista Diquattro.
Suriani had requested a new assignment because of health problems associated with high altitudes. La Paz is located 3,640 metres above sea level.

On 24 September 2009 Suriani was appointed to a senior position as the Secretariat of State. As Delegate for Papal Representatives he has responsibility for coordinating the affairs of the Holy See's diplomats.

On 7 December 2015 Pope Francis appointed him nuncio to Serbia.

On 13 May 2022 Pope Francis appointed him nuncio to Bulgaria.[5]

See also
 List of heads of the diplomatic missions of the Holy See

References

5 https://press.vatican.va/content/salastampa/it/bollettino/pubblico/2022/05/13/0354/00753.html

External links

1957 births
Living people
People from Atessa
Apostolic Nuncios to Bolivia
Apostolic Nuncios to Serbia
Apostolic Nuncios to Bulgaria
Apostolic Nuncios to North Macedonia
21st-century Italian Roman Catholic titular archbishops
Pontifical Ecclesiastical Academy alumni